Shaghayegh Cyrous (Persian: شقایق سیروس; born 1987) is an American artist and curator based in San Francisco. Her interactive time-based investigations, participatory projects, and video installations have been said to "create a poetic space for human connections."

Early life
Cyrous was born in 1987 in Tehran, Iran. She obtained her BA degree in Visual Art Studies from the University of Science and Culture in Tehran. She lived in Iran until the Iranian Green Movement, when political tensions made her decide to move to the United States in 2011. She settled in San Francisco, where she graduated with a Master of Fine Arts Social Practice from the California College of Arts (CCA) in 2017. Immediately upon graduation, Cyrous became a fellow at Escuela de Arte Útil, a project initiated by Tania Bruguera.

Career
Together with the Iranian artist Keyvan Shovir, she put up the mural In Memory Of in Clarion Alley in 2015. The mural depicts three famous Iranian women writers - Simin Daneshvar, Simin Behbahani, and Forough Farrokhzad. Cyrous and Shovir had already created another work there, portraying writers and artists imprisoned in Iran, and Cyrous installed her Lost Rug Project in Clarion Alley. Cyrous co-curated Inside Out Iran, an exhibition of Iranian urban art in London in 2015. She was the executive producer of Mutiny of Colours, a feature-length documentary film about street art and graffiti in Iran. She curated the video exhibition Eleven and a Half Hours in Oakland in 2017, displaying the works of the Iranian artist Shirin Abedinirad and the American artist Dionne Lee. Cyrous combined the two with the intention of "blurring lines between the two cultures... making Iran and Oakland feel like the same place." She chose that title because eleven and a half hours is the time difference between San Francisco and Tehran. Her own work A Window to Tehran, with a video diptych synchronizing the San Francisco sunrise with the Tehran sunset, was based on the same idea. In 2019, Cyrous created The sun will rise the next day, a video installation with the names of political prisoners incarcerated in Iran since the beginning of the Iranian Green Movement in 2011 and until 2019.

In August 2021, Cyrous founded Zamin Project, which aims to connect and represent artists and educators from the SWANA (South West Asian and North African) Community in the San Francisco Bay Area. The project includes initiatives such as discussion panels, artists' interviews and Zamin Project Archive.

Notable works
2014 - Klozar Weaving, Iran and California 
2015 - In Memory Of (collaboration with Keyvan Shovir), Clarion Alley, San Francisco, California 
2015 - Inside Out Iran (exhibition curator), London, UK
2016 - A Window to Tehran, Root Division’s galleries, San Francisco, California
2017 - Eleven and a Half Hours (exhibition curator), Oakland, California
2018 - Over Here Not Yet (collaborative work with Renée Rhodes) Royal NoneSuch Gallery, Oakland, California 
2018 - East of West, Santa Fe, New Mexico
2019 - Rock E Malta (collaborative work with Kim Epifano) 
2019 - The sun will rise the next day, (video installation at Minnesota Street Project), San Francisco, California 
2019 - “Rock & Mortar” (video installation for the Epiphany Dance Theater's performance), San Francisco, California 
2020 - Reenacting the Future, SF Bay Area, California

See also  
 List of Iranian women artists

References

External links 
 
 
  

 Living people 
1987 births 
21st-century American women artists
American artists of Iranian descent
American curators
American installation artists
American women curators
Artists from San Francisco 
California College of the Arts alumni
Iranian emigrants to the United States